Al Fletcher (born Alastair Fletcher; 14 October 1970 – 25 July 2016) was an English musician who was a drummer with Gigantic, Ultraviolet and Die So Fluid. He has also performed live and as session musician with ska group The Selecter.

References

1970 births
2016 deaths
English rock drummers
English session musicians
Place of birth missing